Maha Sarakham province is one of the 76 provinces (changwat) of Thailand which lies in central northeastern Thailand, also called Isan. Its neighbouring provinces are (from north clockwise): Kalasin, Roi Et, Surin, Buriram, and Khon Kaen.

The town of Maha Sarakham is the provincial capital. It is the home of Mahasarakham University, the one of the largest universities in northeast Thailand with 41,000 students (2017),  and Rajabhat Mahasarakham University.

Geography 
The province is mostly a plain covered with rice fields. Only in the north and east are there small hills. The province is between 130 and 230 m above sea level. The main river is the Chi.

History 
Maha Sarakham was originally a satellite town of Roi Et, founded in 1865. The governor of Roi Et sent 9,000 people to populate the new town, and one of his cousins as its governor. In 1868 the central government in Bangkok declared Maha Sarakham a province of its own under the supervision of Bangkok. One of the reasons was that this step weakened the power of Roi Et.

Symbols 
The provincial seal shows a tree in front of rice fields, symbolizing the richness of resources in the province.

The provincial flag shows the seal in the middle, in a brown horizontal strip. Above and below is a yellow strip. The brown color symbolizes the strength and the perseverance of the people in the province, who live in the rather dry climate; the yellow color symbolizes the robes of Buddhist monks as evidence of the faith of the people.

The provincial tree is the woman's tongue tree (Albizia lebbeck). The tree symbol was assigned to the province in 1994 by Queen Sirikit. The provincial flower is the West Indian jasmine (Ixora).

Administration

Provincial government
The province is divided into 13 districts (amphoes). The districts are further divided into 133 subdistricts (tambons) and 1,804 villages (mubans).

Local government
As of 26 November 2019 there are: one Maha Sarakham Provincial Administration Organisation and 19 municipal (thesaban) areas in the province. Maha Sarakham has town (thesaban mueang) status. Further 18 subdistrict municipalities (thesaban tambon). The non-municipal areas are administered by 123 Subdistrict Administrative Organisations - SAO (ongkan borihan suan tambon).

Human achievement index 2017

Since 2003, United Nations Development Programme (UNDP) in Thailand has tracked progress on human development at sub-national level using the Human achievement index (HAI), a composite index covering all the eight key areas of human development. National Economic and Social Development Board (NESDB) has taken over this task since 2017.

References

External links

About Maha Sarakham, Tourism Authority of Thailand (TAT)

Provincial website (Thai only)
Maha Sarakham provincial map, coat of arms and postal stamp
 Photos of Maha Sarakham, 1963

 
Isan
Provinces of Thailand